Division No. 3, Subdivision F is an unorganized subdivision on the southwest coast of Newfoundland and Labrador, Canada. According to the 2016 Statistics Canada Census:

 Population: 119
 % Change (2011 to 2016): -14.4
 Dwellings: 188
 Area: 2,634.58 km2
 Density: 0.0 people/km2

Division No. 3, Subdivision F includes the unincorporated communities of

 Bay de Loup
 Burgeo
 Coppett
 Deer Island
 Dog Cove
 Fox Island
 Fox Island Harbour
 Grey River
 Hunt's Island
 Little River
 Red Island
 Upper Burgeo

References

Newfoundland and Labrador subdivisions